Coltrane is an Irish surname derived from the Irish language Ó Coltaráin. Notable people with the surname include:

 Alice Coltrane (1937–2007), American jazz musician, wife of John Coltrane
 David S. Coltrane (1893–1968), American politician
 Chi Coltrane (born 1948), American rock musician
 Ellar Coltrane (born 1994), American actor
 John Coltrane (1926–1967), American jazz saxophonist
 Ravi Coltrane (born 1965), American jazz saxophonist, son of John Coltrane
 Robbie Coltrane (1950–2022), Scottish actor

Fictional characters:
 Sheriff Rosco P. Coltrane, character on The Dukes of Hazzard

References

Anglicised Irish-language surnames